Avengers: Infinity War is the third Avengers film and the nineteenth film in the Marvel Cinematic Universe (MCU), released six years after the first Avengers film and ten years after the first MCU film. Directed by Anthony and Joe Russo, the film features an ensemble cast of actors reprising their roles from previous entries in the MCU. Box office analysts identified positive word of mouth and anticipation built up over the course of the MCU as factors working in the film's favor.

Infinity War was released in April 2018 and went on to break multiple box office records in various markets. Worldwide, it set the record for the highest opening weekend gross, was the fastest film ever to gross $1 billion and $1.5 billion, and became the highest-grossing film of 2018. In its domestic market of the United States and Canada, the film set records for the highest-grossing opening weekend, Saturday, and Sunday, as well as the fastest cumulative grosses to $150 million through $250 million. Elsewhere, it became the highest-grossing film of all time in more than ten markets including Brazil, Mexico, and the Philippines.

Many of the records set by the film are listed below. Data on the previous record and records that have since been surpassed are presented where available and applicable. All grosses are given in unadjusted US dollars, except where noted otherwise.

Worldwide
Avengers: Infinity War grossed $2,048,359,754 worldwide. The film set records for the highest-grossing opening weekend, was the fastest to gross $1 billion through $1.5 billion, and achieved the highest gross in the 4DX format.

United States and Canada

Avengers: Infinity War grossed $678,815,482 in the United States and Canada. The film set records for the highest-grossing opening weekend and was the fastest to gross $150 million through $250 million. It also set several single-day records and had the widest PG-13 opening and release to date.

Other territories
Avengers: Infinity War grossed $1,369,544,272 outside the United States and Canada market. The film became the highest-grossing of all time in more than ten markets across Latin America and Asia. It also set various opening records in over 20 markets across all continents except Oceania and Antarctica. Data on precise figures, previous record holders, and surpassed records is limited due to the absence of box office record trackers for these markets.

See also
 List of box office records set by Avengers: Endgame
 List of highest-grossing films
 List of fastest-grossing films
 United States box office records

References

Box office records set by Avengers: Infinity War
Avengers: Infinity War
Avengers: Infinity War box office
Avengers: Infinity War box office
Avengers: Infinity War box office